Éloyes is a commune in the Vosges department in Grand Est in northeastern France. Éloyes station has rail connections to Épinal, Remiremont and Nancy.

See also
Communes of the Vosges department

References

Communes of Vosges (department)